Kampong Sungai Tilong is a village in Brunei-Muara District, Brunei. The population was 4,054 in 2016. It is one of the villages within Mukim Berakas 'B'. The postcode is BC3315.

See also 
 Kampong Sungai Hanching

References 

Sungai Tilong